Two human polls comprised the 1958 NCAA University Division football rankings. Unlike most sports, college football's governing body, the NCAA, does not bestow a national championship, instead that title is bestowed by one or more different polling agencies. There are two main weekly polls that begin in the preseason—the AP Poll and the Coaches Poll.

Legend

AP Poll
The final AP Poll was released on December 1, at the end of the 1958 regular season, weeks before the major bowls. The AP would not release a post-bowl season final poll regularly until 1968.

Final Coaches Poll
The final UPI Coaches Poll was released prior to the bowl games, on 
LSU received 29 of the 35 first-place votes; Iowa received four, and one each went to Army and Air Force.

 Prior to the 1975 season, the Big Ten and Pacific Coast (later AAWU / Pac-8) conferences allowed only one postseason participant each, for the Rose Bowl.
 The Ivy League has prohibited its members from participating in postseason football since the league was officially formed in 1954.

References

College football rankings